WPA, or Western Provident Association, is a not-for-profit private medical insurance firm based in Taunton, Somerset.  Its subsidiary, WPA Protocol Plc, administers corporate healthcare trusts.

History

In 1901, a group of workers founded the Reading Work People's Voluntary Hospital Contributory Fund to cover the costs of health care for their members.  In 1939, it merged with the Bristol Hospital Fund, and in 1949 it was renamed the Western Provident Association (WPA).  In 1992, WPA moved from Bristol to a specially designed building in Taunton, Somerset.

Coinsurance

WPA was described by the World Health Organization as leading in the development of coinsurance, or "shared responsibility", policies, in which the patient pays a portion of the liability until an agreed limit.

WPA vs. Norwich Union Healthcare

In 1997, Norwich Union staff falsely claimed over e-mail that WPA was insolvent.  WPA sued for defamation.   Norwich Union made a High Court apology and paid £450,000 in damages and costs to settle the case.  This was a landmark case because it was the first  time e-mail was admitted as evidence in a British court.

Cancer Drugs and NHS Top-Up

In 2007, WPA launched a new insurance plan which provided a health "top-up", supplementing NHS treatment. Subsequently, other insurance companies have entered the top-up market and criticism has been levelled at the products from the union Unison which stated that the products would undermine the values of the NHS and risk creating a two-tier system in health care.

WPA Protocol Plc

WPA Protocol administers corporate healthcare trusts.  This is an alternative arrangement to private medical insurance whereby larger companies, defined by Protocol as usually those with 400 or more members, can use WPA's infrastructure to administer their own healthcare provision.  Companies provide the funds from a trust, and WPA Protocol provides bespoke literature and telephone lines, as well as staff, infrastructure and economies of scale.

Trusts are not charged insurance premium tax and staff are considered to be more likely to claim responsibly from their own company as opposed to an insurer.  Savings are estimated to be 7% compared to being fully insured.

WPA Healthcare Practice Plc

The WPA Healthcare Practice Plc is a wholly owned subsidiary of WPA, authorised and regulated by the Financial Conduct Authority.  Healthcare Partners (franchisees), either as sole traders or limited companies, are Appointed Representatives of the WPA Healthcare Practice Plc.

Partners buy into the Healthcare Practice franchise model – they market and distribute WPA health insurance products on WPA’s behalf.  The Healthcare Practice is WPA’s main distribution channel with responsibilities for the appointment and monitoring of Healthcare Partners.

The Healthcare Practice is formed by a network of Healthcare Partners throughout the UK.  Healthcare Partners are the local face of WPA in their community and only advise on WPA’s products and services.

References

External links
WPA website
WPA Protocol PLC website

Health insurance companies of the United Kingdom
Companies based in Taunton
Non-profit organisations based in the United Kingdom